John Gilmore (February 18, 1780 – May 11, 1845) was a Jacksonian member of the U.S. House of Representatives from Pennsylvania.

Biography
John Gilmore (father of Alfred Gilmore) born in Somerset County, Pennsylvania.  He moved with his parents to Washington, Pennsylvania, in 1780.  He studied law, was admitted to the bar in 1801 and commenced practice in Washington.  He moved to Butler, Pennsylvania, in 1803.  He was appointed deputy district attorney for Butler County, Pennsylvania, in 1803.  He was a member of the Pennsylvania House of Representatives from 1816 to 1821 and served as speaker in 1821.

Gilmore was elected as a Jacksonian to the Twenty-first and Twenty-second Congresses.  He was elected State treasurer by the legislature of Pennsylvania in 1841.  He died in Butler in 1845.  Interment in North Cemetery.

See also
 Speaker of the Pennsylvania House of Representatives

Sources

The Political Graveyard

Members of the Pennsylvania House of Representatives
Speakers of the Pennsylvania House of Representatives
Pennsylvania lawyers
Politicians from Pittsburgh
1780 births
1845 deaths
Jacksonian members of the United States House of Representatives from Pennsylvania
19th-century American politicians